Animal Problems is a children's book series by Jory John, illustrated by Lane Smith, and published by Random House Books for Young Readers. The series includes three books: Penguin Problems (2016), Giraffe Problems (2018), and Cat Problems (2021).

The books have received starred reviews from The Horn Book, Kirkus Reviews, Booklist, Publishers Weekly, and School Library Journal.

Penguin Problems (2016) 

Penguin Problems, published  September 27, 2016, is a comedic picture book about the struggles penguins face in Antarctica.

The book received starred reviews from The Horn Book and Kirkus Reviews, as well as the following accolades:

 Junior Library Guild selection
 Beehive Award Nominee (2019)
 Prairie Bloom Book Award Nominee (2018-2019)
 Bank Street College of Education Best Children's Books of the Year (2017)
 Kirkus Prize for Young Readers Nominee (2016)
 The Irish Times Best Children's Books of the Year (2016)

Giraffe Problems (2018) 
Giraffe Problems, published September 25, 2018, is a comedic picture book about a self-conscious giraffe.

The book received starred reviews from Booklist, Publishers Weekly, and School Library Journal,  as well as the following accolades:

 Junior Library Guild Selection
 Bill Martin, Jr. Picture Book Award Nominee (2020)
 MRLS Cream of the Crop (2019)

Cat Problems (2021) 
Cat Problems, published August 3, 2021, is a comedic picture book about a pampered house cat.

The book received a starred review from Booklist, as well as the following accolades:

 IndieBound National Bestseller 
 IndieNext List Pick (2021)

References 

American children's book series
Random House books
Book series introduced in 2016
American picture books